Lesotho Correctional Services football club are a team based in Maseru, Lesotho. They compete in the Lesotho Premier League and have won four league titles.

Achievements
Lesotho Premier League: 6
2000, 2002 (both as Lesotho Prisons Service)
2007, 2008, 2011, 2012.

Performance in CAF competitions
CAF Champions League: 1 appearance
2008 – Preliminary Round
2012 – Preliminary Round

CAF Confederation Cup: 0 appearance

CAF Super Cup: 0 appearance

Lesotho Premier League clubs
Works association football teams
Organisations based in Maseru